Supermodel was a Swiss reality television series which aired on 3+ in 2007 and 2008. The series documented a modeling competition, comprising novice models, to find a "Supermodel". The first season of series, which aired from November to December 2007, was presented by former model Nadja Schildknecht, and the second, which aired from September to December 2008, was presented by Franziska Knuppe.

Show format
After an episode featuring the casting process with 100 chosen contestants, the experiences of the finalists with a weekly photo shoot, and several tasks and castings were shown in one episode that ended with the eliminated of two contestants.

Makeovers were administered to contestants early in the season (usually after the first or second elimination in the finals)

Seasons

References

Swiss reality television series
2007 Swiss television series debuts
2008 Swiss television series endings
German-language television shows